The SER F class was a class of 4-4-0 steam locomotives of the South Eastern Railway. The class was designed by James Stirling and introduced in 1883.

Rebuilding
The locomotives passed to the South Eastern and Chatham Railway in 1899 and 76 were rebuilt by Harry Wainwright to Class F1 between 1903 and 1919.

Numbering
Twelve unrebuilt locomotives survived into Southern Railway ownership on 1 January 1923 with random numbers between 22 and 241. All had been withdrawn by 1930.

Accidents and incidents
London due to a signalman's error. Three people were killed and twenty were injured.

References

F
4-4-0 locomotives
Railway locomotives introduced in 1883
Scrapped locomotives
Standard gauge steam locomotives of Great Britain